Wyoming Highway 311 (WYO 311) is a  north-south Wyoming State Road located in central Platte County, Wyoming that runs from Wyoming Highway 310, west of Wheatland, to Platte County Routes 139 & 90 northwest of Wheatland.

Route description 
Wyoming Highway 311 is a fairly short state highway located west of Wheatland in the CDP of Westview Circle. Wyoming 311 runs from WYO 310 (Hightower Road) north to an intersection with Platte County Route 139 and County Route 90 (Fletcher Park Road).
 Mileposts increase from south to north along WYO 311.

Major intersections

References

External links 

Wyoming State Routes 300-399
WYO 311 - WYO 310 to Fairview Road
Wheatland, WY Homepage

Transportation in Platte County, Wyoming
311